The Women's Open bench press weightlifting event was an event at the weightlifting competition The whole competition took place on 12 October at 14:00. The event took  place at the Jawaharlal Nehru Stadium, Delhi.

Results

See also 
2010 Commonwealth Games
Weightlifting at the 2010 Commonwealth Games

References

Weightlifting at the 2010 Commonwealth Games
Com